The Alsco Uniforms 250 is a NASCAR Xfinity Series race at Atlanta Motor Speedway in Hampton, Georgia. The race is one of two Xfinity Series races at Atlanta along with the Nalley Cars 250 in the spring.

History

The track had previously always held one Busch/Nationwide/Xfinity Series race, but in 2021, when the NASCAR Cup Series got a second race at Atlanta for the first time since 2010, this Xfinity Series race was added to the schedule on the same weekend in July as the new Cup Series race. Credit Karma held the naming rights to the race that year. In 2022, Alsco replaced Credit Karma as the title sponsor. When the start times for all of NASCAR's events were announced, the 2023 event will become a Saturday night event to coincide with the track's second Cup race returning to a nighttime event.

Past winners

2021: Race extended due to an overtime. Kyle Busch's 102nd and final Xfinity Series win, since he would retire from the division once he reached 100 wins.

References

External links

2021 establishments in Georgia (U.S. state)
NASCAR Xfinity Series races
 
Recurring sporting events established in 2021
Annual sporting events in the United States